Prince George William of Hesse-Darmstadt (11 July 1722 – 21 June 1782) was a Prince of Hesse-Darmstadt. He was born in Darmstadt.

He was the second son of Landgrave Louis VIII and Charlotte Christine Magdalene Johanna of Hanau-Lichtenberg. From 1738 till his death, he commanded an army-regiment of his land. In the 1740s, he also commanded a Prussian regiment. He reached the rank of general of the cavalry. He was the official military adviser to his father, but had a strong rival in his older brother Louis IX, who followed his friend's example, the soldier-king Frederick II of Prussia and expanded Pirmasens as a garrison town.

In 1748, he married Countess Maria Louise Albertine of Leiningen-Dagsburg-Falkenburg. Through this marriage, he acquired the estates of Broich, Oberstein, Aspermont, Burgel, and Reipolzkirchen.  He and Maria had nine children.

In 1764, George William received Old Palace in Darmstadt and the associated pleasure garden as a gift from his father, who had always favoured him above his brother Louis. George William had the palace with the White Tower expanded. He represented the reigning family in Darmstadt, as his brother stayed mostly in Pirmasens.

Issue

Ancestry

References 

 Johann Friedrich Schannat: Eiflia Illustrata... S. 515
 Philipp Alexander Ferdinand Walther:  Darmstadt wie es war und wie es geworden S. 187

External links

1722 births
1782 deaths
Princes of Hesse-Darmstadt
Landgraves of Hesse-Darmstadt
Nobility from Darmstadt
Generals of the Holy Roman Empire
Recipients of the Order of the White Eagle (Poland)
Sons of monarchs